Talita de Alencar Rodrigues (born August 23, 1934) is a former Olympic freestyle swimmer from Brazil, who competed at one Summer Olympics for her native country.

At 13 years old, she was at the 1948 Summer Olympics, in London, where she finished 6th in the 4×100-metre freestyle, along with Eleonora Schmitt, Maria da Costa and Piedade Coutinho.  Even today, she is the youngest member of a Brazilian swimming delegation in Olympic history.

At the inaugural Pan American Games in 1951, in Buenos Aires, Argentina, she claimed a bronze medal in the 4×100-metre freestyle. She also finished 5th in the 200-metre freestyle.

References

1934 births
Living people
Brazilian female freestyle swimmers
Swimmers at the 1948 Summer Olympics
Swimmers at the 1951 Pan American Games
Olympic swimmers of Brazil
Pan American Games bronze medalists for Brazil
Pan American Games medalists in swimming
Medalists at the 1951 Pan American Games
20th-century Brazilian women